Jamestown Business College (JBC) is a for-profit college in Jamestown, New York. It was founded in 1886. The college offers a 2-year Associate in Applied Science (AAS) degree, a 4-year Bachelor in Business Administration (BBA) degree and a Master in Business Administration (MBA) Degree in partnership with Gannon University in Erie, Pennsylvania. Jamestown Business College is accredited by the Middle States Commission on Higher Education. The school uses EDGE (Etiquette, Dress, Goals and Ethics), a program focused on practical and academic training, alongside traditional curriculum, as well as a similar program called LEAD (Leadership, Effectiveness, Accountability and Diversity).

References

External links
 Official website

Jamestown, New York
For-profit universities and colleges in the United States
Education in Chautauqua County, New York
Private universities and colleges in New York (state)